Small Island may refer to:

 Small Island (novel), a 2004 novel by Andrea Levy
 Small Island (TV series), a 2009 British two-part television drama based on the novel
 Small Island (play), a 2019 play by Helen Edmundson based on the novel

 Small Island (Antarctica), island in the Antarctic

See also 
Notes from a Small Island, a 1995 travel book by Bill Bryson
Small Isles, an archipelago part of the Inner Hebrides, Highland, Scotland